VOEA Ngahau Koula (P301) is a  designed and built for the Tonga Maritime Force by Australia. After the United Nations Convention on the Law of the Sea established that all maritime nation were entitled to exercise control over a  exclusive economic zone, Australia agreed to give small patrol boats to Tonga and eleven other neighbours in the Pacific Islands Forum.

Those vessels were designed to have a working life of at least 30 years, so Australia designed the Guardian class, a slightly larger, and more capable replacement class. Australia delivered Ngahau Koula to Tonga on June 21, 2019. A second replacement vessel will follow in 2021.

The vessel's name means "Golden Arrow". She has been designed to be able to accommodate crews of mixed gender.

Operation career
Nahagau Koula was commissioned by King Tupou VI on October 16, 2019.

The vessel was involved in the response to the 2022 Hunga Tonga–Hunga Ha'apai eruption and tsunami, evacuating all residents of Mango island to Tongatapu.

References

Naval ships of Tonga
Guardian class patrol vessels
2019 ships
Ships built by Austal